Alliance City Schools is a school district located in Stark County, Ohio, United States. There are three elementary schools containing grades 1–5, and one early learning school containing only pre-school and kindergarten, one middle school, and one high school.

Alliance High School

Alliance High School is a public high school in Alliance, Ohio. It is the only high school in the Alliance City Schools district. The current facility is the third building to be known as Alliance High School. Currently it houses grades 9–12 with an enrollment of a thousand students. The sports teams for the high school are known as the Aviators in respect for the airplane production plants in the area in the 1920s. These included Taylorcraft and ArgoHess to name a few. They are in the Eastern Buckeye Conference.

Notable alumni
 Jack Warner, Former MLB player (Chicago Cubs)
 Len Dawson, Former NFL player (Kansas City Chiefs)

Notes and references

External links
 Official Site

School districts in Stark County, Ohio
Alliance, Ohio